Alan Wood may refer to:
 Alan Wood (Australian politician) (1927–2005), Victorian state politician
 Alan Wood (engineer) (born 1947), British engineer and executive
 Allen Wood (footballer) (1941–2018), sometimes listed as Alan, Welsh football player
 Alan Wood (footballer, born 1900) (1900–?), English footballer
 Alan Wood (footballer, born 1954), English football player
 Alan Wood (military officer) (1922–2013), American naval officer
 Alan Wood Jr. (1834–1902), U.S. Representative from Pennsylvania
 Alan Muir Wood (1921–2009), British civil engineer
 Alan Thorpe Richard Wood (born 1954), British public servant

See also
 Allan Singleton-Wood (born 1933), British musician and publisher who performed under the stage name Allan Wood
 Allan Wood (1943–2022), Australian swimmer
 Allen Wood (disambiguation)
 Al Wood (born 1958), American basketball player
 Alan Woods (disambiguation)